The Temptations is the self-titled twenty-seventh studio album by American R&B group The Temptations, released via Motown's subsidiary label, Gordy Records on August 7, 1981. The album is the group's third album upon their return to Gordy Records after their brief stint at Atlantic Records.

Background 
The album is the result of The Temptations' collaboration with the critically acclaimed record producer Thom Bell, whom they had met eight years prior. The album features two original members of the group, Otis Williams and Melvin Franklin, recurring member Dennis Edwards, and more recent members Richard Street and Glenn Leonard.

Reception 
The album leans more toward pop, which alienated them from their R&B audience.

According to Craig Lytle of AllMusic, the reason why the album wasn't a huge success was that it wasn't marketed to a crossover audience.

Chart performance 
The album peaked at No. 119 on the Billboard 200 albums chart and No. 36 on the Top Black Albums albums chart. The only charting single from the album was the album's debut single, the uptempo R&B groove "Aiming at Your Heart" featuring Street and Leonard on lead vocals. The single peaked at No. 67 on the Billboard Hot 100. It was more successful on the Hot Soul Singles chart, reaching No. 36.

Track listing 
All tracks are arranged by Thom Bell, except where noted.

Personnel 
Adapted from Discogs.

Musicians:
The Temptations (Otis Williams, Melvin Franklin, Dennis Edwards, Richard Street, Glenn Leonard) – vocals
Thom Bell – keyboards
Bobby Eli, Bill Neale – guitars
Bob Babbitt – bass
Charles Collins – drums
Larry B. Washington, Edward W. Shea – percussion
Don Renaldo and His Strings and Horns – strings and horns

Production:
Thom Bell – arrangements, conductor
Bill Neale – arrangements, conductor (tracks: "Aiming At Your Heart", "Your Lovin' Is Magic")
Dirk Dalvin – chief engineer
Bruce Bluestein, Rob Perkins, Rick Fisher – assistant engineer
Tammara Bell – production coordinator
Johnny Lee – art direction
Terry Taylor – design
Francesco Alexander – photography

Charts

References

External links 

 The Temptations on Discogs
 The Temptations on Rate Your Music

The Temptations albums
1981 albums
Gordy Records albums